The Shield of the Trinity or Scutum Fidei (Latin for "shield of faith") is a traditional Christian visual symbol which expresses many aspects of the doctrine of the Trinity, summarizing the first part of the Athanasian Creed in a compact diagram. In late medieval Europe, this emblem was considered to be the heraldic arms of God (and of the Trinity).

Description

This diagram consists of four nodes (generally circular in shape) interconnected by six links. The three nodes at the edge of the diagram are labelled with the names of the three persons of the Trinity (traditionally the Latin-language names, or scribal abbreviations thereof): The Father ("PATER"), The Son ("FILIUS"), and The Holy Spirit ("SPIRITUS SANCTUS"). The node in the center of the diagram (within the triangle formed by the other three nodes) is labelled God (Latin "DEUS"), while the three links connecting the center node with the outer nodes are labelled "is" (Latin "EST"), and the three links connecting the outer nodes to each other are labelled "is not" (Latin "NON EST").

The links are non-directional—this is emphasized in one thirteenth-century manuscript by writing the link captions "EST" or "NON EST" twice as many times (going in both directions within each link), and is shown in some modern versions of the diagram by superimposing each occurrence of the "is" / "is not" text on a double-headed arrow ↔ (rather than enclosing it within a link). So the following twelve propositions can be read off the diagram:

 "The Father is God"
 "The Son is God"
 "The Holy Spirit is God"
 "God is the Father"
 "God is the Son"
 "God is the Holy Spirit"
 "The Father is not the Son"
 "The Father is not the Holy Spirit"
 "The Son is not the Father"
 "The Son is not the Holy Spirit"
 "The Holy Spirit is not the Father"
 "The Holy Spirit is not the Son"

The Shield of the Trinity is not generally intended to be any kind of schematic diagram of the structure of God, but instead is merely a compact visual device from which the above statements (contained in or implied by the Athanasian Creed) can be read off.

History

The precise origin of this diagram is unknown, but it was evidently influenced by 12th-century experiments in symbolizing the Trinity in abstract visual form—mainly by Petrus Alfonsi's Tetragrammaton-Trinity diagram of c. 1109 (and possibly also by Joachim of Fiore's different Tetragrammaton-Trinity diagram of three circles, which in turn led to the Borromean rings being used as a symbol of the Trinity ), in combination with the Athanasian Creed. The Shield of the Trinity diagram is attested from as early as a c. 1208–1216 manuscript of Peter of Poitiers' Compendium Historiae in Genealogia Christi, but the period of its most widespread use was during the 15th and 16th centuries, when it is in found in a number of English and French manuscripts and books (such as the Sherborne Missal), and as part of stained-glass windows and ornamental carvings in a number of churches (many in East Anglia). The diagram was used heraldically from the mid-13th century, when a shield-shaped version of the diagram (not actually placed on a shield) was included among the c. 1250 heraldic shields in Matthew Paris' Chronica Majora, while the c. 1260 allegorical illustrations of a knight battling the seven deadly sins in a manuscript of William Peraldus' Summa Vitiorum, and of a woman penitent fending off diabolical attacks in the De Quincy Apocalypse, show the diagram placed on a shield. In the 15th century, one form of the Shield of the Trinity was considered to be the coat of arms of God (see discussion below). The use of the diagram declined in England with the rise of Protestantism, and from the 17th century to the early 19th century, it was mainly of interest to historians of heraldry; but beginning in the 19th century it underwent a limited revival as an actively used Christian symbol among English-speaking Christians, partly due to being included in books such as the Handbook of Christian Symbolism by William James Audsley and George Ashdown Audsley (1865).

Name
The only name for this diagram which was in any regular use during the Middle Ages was "Scutum Fidei" (a Latin phrase meaning "Shield of the Faith", taken from the Vulgate of Ephesians verse 6:16). For example, in this c. 1247–1258 manuscript of John of Wallingford's writings, the quote from Ephesians 6:16 is placed directly above the diagram.

The particular phrase "Shield of the Trinity", which is now the most common name for the diagram in English, didn't come into regular use until the 20th century. However, it is called in Latin Scutum Sancte Trinitatis or "Shield of the Holy Trinity" (where sancte is a medieval form for more classical sanctae) on the font in Crosthwaite Church, near Keswick, Cumbria, England. Other variant names are "Arms of the Trinity", "Shield of the Blessed Trinity", "Emblem of the Trinity", "Arms of the Faith", "Emblem of the Holy and Undivided Trinity", etc.

Variations
Some variations of the Shield of the Trinity diagram are shown in the image below:

A shield-shaped version of the diagram placed on a red shield (heraldic "gules") was attributed as the arms of God (and of the Trinity) by heralds in 15th-century England and France. The "banner of the Trinity" which Jean Le Fevre, Seigneur of St. Remy, and Jehan de Wavrin attest that Henry V of England displayed at Agincourt would have been the same (but with the emblem on a red flag instead of a red shield). This coat of arms was given the following heraldic blazon in "On Sacred Heraldry" by E.L. Blackburne (attached as Appendix II to Emblems of the Saints, By which they are Distinguished in Works of Art by F. C. Husenbeth, edited by Augustus Jessopp, 3rd.ed. 1882):

Gules, an orle and pall Argent, conjoined and surmounted of four plates, occupying the dexter and sinister chief and the base and fess points respectively; the first inscribed "Pater", the second "Filius", and the third "Spiritus Sanctus", the centre "Deus"; the connecting portions of the orle between them having the words "non est", and those of the pall "est".

The diagram on a blue shield (heraldic "azure") was the coat of arms of the Priory of Black Canons (monastery of Christ Church) near Aldgate in the City of London (see also the 15th-century coat of arms attributed to St. Michael the Archangel and the modern coat of arms of the Anglican diocese of Trinidad shown below). Two of the 13th-century manuscripts have the diagram on a green shield (heraldic "vert"), which is also found in the coat of arms of Trinity Parish, Jersey shown below. Green is the color of Trinity Sunday or the Trinity liturgical season in some traditions.

Other variant forms of the diagram have the lettering on nodes and links with a yellow background color (instead of white), since "or" (i.e. gold/yellow) is the other heraldic "metal" color. So the arms attributed to St. Faith in late medieval England consist of a diagram with lettering on yellow, placed on a red or blue shield, while the parish of the Forest, Guernsey uses a diagram with lettering on white or yellow nodes and links, placed on a green shield.

In the Middle Ages, the shield-shaped version of the diagram was sometimes imagined as a protective shield wielded by the Archangel Michael, or by an ordinary soul, in the spiritual warfare against dark forces described in Ephesians chapter 6 (as in the c. 1260 allegorical illustrations in manuscripts of Peraldus' Summa Vitiorum and the De Quincy Apocalypse).

A symmetrical rounded form of the diagram with one vertex up and two down was apparently popularized in the modern period by the Audsleys' Handbook of Christian Symbolism; this rounded form also occurs with one vertex down and two up. The outer node captions can be reduced to simple initials ("P", "F", and "SS"). On the coat of arms of Trinity Parish, Jersey shown below, all four node captions are reduced to single initials, and in some late medieval English church decorations (such as the bench end at Holy Trinity church, Blythburgh, Suffolk and the font at St John the Baptist church, Butley, Suffolk) the four connected circles are intended as a symbol of the Trinity even when all text is omitted.

Obviously, many further slight artistic variations can occur in the relative sizes of nodes and links, their exact placement, in lettering styles, in further decorative elaboration, etc. Occasionally one or more of the outer nodes is drawn as a non-circular shape to fit within a space allotted.

Also, the diagram can be color-coded in order to bring out the interrelationships between its elements more clearly; in the version included above, the positive or asserting parts of the diagram are shown in black, while the negative or denying parts of the diagram are in red. This is similar to the version of the Shield of the Trinity present in a 15th-century stained glass window in St. Peter and St. Paul church, Fressingfield, Suffolk, England (where only the positive or asserting parts of the diagram are shown—see link below).

Finally, a version of the diagram with translated English-language captions is shown in the illustration above. (For simplicity, the definite article could also be left out of the English translations of the outer node captions, as in the next illustration below.) In the Middle Ages, Latin was the liturgical language and main language of scholarship of Western Europe, so that Latin captions were then most often used (but at least one old rendition of the diagram in another language is attested in the c. 1260 Anglo-Norman French allegorical illustration in the De Quincy Apocalypse).

Orientation of diagram, and placement of outer node captions
As the First Person of the Trinity, the Father is always in the most honorable position in the diagram. So in the form of the diagram with one vertex down, the caption "PATER" or Father is always placed in the top left node (which is heraldically the top right or "dexter chief", when considered from the point of view of someone holding the shield from behind). And in the form of the diagram with one vertex up, the caption "PATER" or Father is always placed in the topmost node. The placement of the captions "FILIUS" or Son and "SPIRITUS SANCTUS" or Holy Spirit in the remaining two outer nodes can vary.

In the 13th-century versions of the diagram, the caption "FILIUS" is placed in the bottom node, and often a cross is drawn in the link between the center node and the bottom node, in order to symbolize the idea that the Second Person of the Trinity entered into the world (or that "The Word was made flesh", as is stated in a Latin annotation on the diagram included in Matthew Paris' Chronica Majora which quotes from the Vulgate of John verse 1:14). However, when this form of the Shield of the Trinity diagram with one vertex down is used after the 13th century, the Son is much more often placed in the top right node, and the Holy Spirit in the bottom node (as shown in the illustrations above).

The diagram below shows the earliest and most recent major variants of the "Shield of the Trinity" diagram: On the left, the form attested in various manuscripts c. 1208–1260 AD, and on the right the form popularized among some English-speaking Protestants in recent years by Paul P. Enns' 1989 book The Moody Handbook of Theology and H. Wayne House's 1992 book Charts of Christian Theology and Doctrine. Note that in the 13th-century manuscripts, the cross is often drawn as a detailed artistic illumination of Christ on the cross, which is not attempted here.

A few authors of 20th-century books on Christian symbolism (such as Edward N. West in Outward Signs: The Language of Christian Symbolism, 1989) have been of the opinion that the form of the diagram with one vertex down and the captions "PATER" and "FILIUS" in the two top nodes is more appropriate for Western Christianity with its Filioque, while the form of the diagram with one vertex up represents more closely the doctrine of the Trinity in Eastern Christianity (without the Filioque)—though this hyper-refined interpretation does not agree with 13th-century usage, nor with the use of versions of the diagram with one vertex up by modern Catholics and Protestants.

Significance
The main achievement of the Shield of the Trinity diagram is to transfer a large part of the essential "mystery" or "paradox" of the Christian doctrine of the Trinity from the realm of complex verbal philosophical abstractions and esoteric theological vocabulary to the realm of simple logic, as presented in the relatively easily graspable form of a concrete and conveniently compact visual diagram. It is remarkable as a basically successful attempt, roughly 800 years old, to represent a complex set of abstract concepts in precise graphic form (as opposed to many of the near-contemporary attempts of Joachim of Fiore and Raymund Lull, which were not so successful). Thus it is perhaps one of the oldest widely attested "graphs", in the sense of graph theory (technically, it is a complete graph on 4 vertices, the same as the vertices and edges of a tetrahedron).

Of course, if the diagram is interpreted according to ordinary logic, then it contains a number of contradictions (since the set of twelve propositions listed above is mutually contradictory). However, if the three links connecting the three outer nodes of the diagram to the center node are interpreted as representing a non-transitive quasi-equivalence relation (where the statement "A is equivalent to C" does not follow from the two statements "A is equivalent to B" and "B is equivalent to C"), then the diagram is fully logically coherent and non-self-contradictory. So the medieval Shield of the Trinity diagram could be considered to contain some implicit kernel of the idea of alternative logical systems.

Unlike some other logical or mathematical constructs sometimes offered as analogies for the Trinity (such as the Venn diagram and the cube viewed by inhabitants of a two-dimensional plane), the Shield of the Trinity does not too easily lend itself to interpretations that are non-orthodox from the traditional mainstream Christian point of view.

Links to depictions of the Shield of the Trinity diagram

13th-century manuscripts
C. 1208–1216 manuscript of Compendium Historiae in Genealogia Christi by Peter of Poitiers (Petrus Pictavensis) — Cotton Faustina B. VII folio 42v
C. 1230 manuscript of Robert Grosseteste's writings — Durham Cathedral manuscript A.III.12, f. 14v
C. 1247–1258 manuscript of John of Wallingford's writings — Cotton Julius D. VII folio 3v at British Library
C. 1255–1265 manuscript of Summa Vitiorum or "A Treatise on the Vices" by William Peraldus — Harley 3244 folios 27–28
Folio 38r of the Abingdon Apocalypse (British Museum additional manuscript 42555, c. 1262) contains a form of the Shield of the Trinity, according to the Michael Evans journal article (however, without text, and with a superimposed central cross).
The diagrams in Matthew Paris' Chronica Majora and the De Quincy Apocalypse (Lambeth palace ms. 209, folio 53r) are not online, but are shown in the Michael Evans journal article (also, a full-page color reproduction of the Lambeth Apocalypse illustration is on page 48 of the Rodney Dennys book).

15th- or 16th-century manuscripts and books
"Scutum fidei Christianae" diagram of Jerome of Prague
Redrawn version of illustration from a Book of Hours printed by Simon Vostre in Paris in 1524 (also reproduced in vol. 2 of Didron's 1843 Christian Iconography).
The illustration for Trinity Sunday in an early 15th-century manuscript (Sherborne Missal) at British Library online.
See the coat of arms attributed to St. Michael ("Sent Myhell") in a 15th-century (c. 1460?) heraldic manuscript in the image at right.
A redrawn version of the arms of the monastery of Christ Church, London can be seen as part of the on-line version of the 1894 book A Glossary of Terms Used in Heraldry by James Parker.

15th- or 16th-century church decorations
Depiction by 16th-century Spanish artist Jerónimo Cosida
Boss at St. Nicholas, Yarmouth, Norfolk, England
Stained-glass window at St. Peter and St. Paul, Salle, Norfolk, England
Font at St. Martin, Nacton, Suffolk, England
Carved baptismal font without text at St Michael's Church, Framlingham
Stained glass window at St. Peter and St. Paul, Fressingfield, Suffolk, England (shows only the "positive" parts of the diagram, as discussed above)

Font at St. John the Baptist, Butley, Suffolk, England
Inscription at Holy Trinity, Blythburgh, Suffolk, England
Textless carving at All Saints, Wighton, Norfolk, England
Photographs of stained-glass windows on Flickr:
St. Peter and St. Paul, Salle, Norfolk
(alternate photo)
All Saints' church, Cambridge
Allington, Lincolnshire
St Peter Mancroft, Norwich
Holy Cross Church, Gilling East, Yorkshire
St. Andrew's Church, Greystoke Cumbria
Sedgeford, Norfolk
Holy Trinity Church, Long Melford, Suffolk

Some modern church decorations
Holy Trinity church, Bottisham, Cambridgeshire (pulpit decoration, shield-shaped diagram on red shield)
St Mary, Sedgeford, Norfolk (stained glass window)
Saint-Maurice-des-Champs, Lille. France (floor inlay)
Grace Episcopal Church, Decorah, Iowa (stained glass window)
Saint Brigid Church, Dublin, Ohio (stained glass window)
St Peter's, Strumpshaw, Norfolk (stained glass window)
St Swithin's, Bintree, Norfolk (stained glass window)
Holy Trinity Church, Leicester (stained glass window)
Holy Trinity, Hurstpierpoint, Sussex (ceiling decoration)
Christ Church cathedral, Dublin (ceiling boss)
St Mary the Virgin, Bromfield, Shropshire (ceiling, one of the few 17th-century uses of the diagram, without nodes)
Design in 1891 book
Church of the Saviour (United Methodist), Cleveland Heights, Ohio (lectern with diagram engraved in its center)
Circular diagram on stained-glass window — St Oswald's, Sowerby, North Yorkshire
Embroidered church decoration (with decorative outer "Sanctus" circle) — Mary Magdalene, Lincoln
Stained glass window with trefoil nodes — St Andrew's Church, Wissett, Suffolk
Stained-glass window — St Andrew, Newcastle
 Stained-glass window — St Andrew, Newcastle
 Stained-glass window — Holy Trinity, Brathay, Cumbria
Stained-glass window — All Saints, Longstanton, Cambridge
Stained-glass window — Waltham Abbey
Stained-glass window — St. Mary's Church, Deerhurst, Gloucestershire
Banner for the first Sunday of Trinity, in seasonal liturgical colors of white and green, with symbols of the three Persons of the Trinity — North Salem Lutheran Church, Sandusky, Ohio
Stained glass window of Shield of Trinity diagram as symbol of the Athanasian Creed — Messiah Evangelical Lutheran Church, Sterling, Illinois
Floor decoration — Our Savior's Lutheran Church in Port Orange, Florida (for artist's draft of design, see here)
 Stained glass window of diagram in circular form — Lehigh Valley Presbyterian Church, Pennsylvania
 Stained glass window of diagram in circular form — Holy Trinity, Avon, Ohio
 Baptismal font, Most Sacred Heart Catholic Church, Eureka, Missouri
1937 version of diagram by Ade Bethune in collection at St. Catherine University
Elaborate stained-glass window with symbolic representations of the three persons of the Trinity filling the three outer nodes — Trinity Episcopal Church, Lawrence, Kansas (photo is contained in PDF file on all the stained-glass windows in the church)
Stone bas-relief on the chapel wall of Howard Hall.

References

Footnotes

General references
 "The Heraldic Imagination" by Rodney Dennys (1975). (Good historic and heraldic references)
"An Illustrated Fragment of Peraldus's Summa of Vice: Harleian MS 3244" by Michael Evans in Journal of the Warburg and Courtauld Institutes, vol. 45 (1982), pp. 14–68.  (Contains descriptions and photos of most known surviving 13th-century diagrams, including experimental attempts to use the basic structure of the diagram for other purposes)
 "Church Symbolism: An Explanation of the more Important Symbols of the Old and New Testament, the Primitive, the Mediaeval and the Modern Church" by Frederick Roth Webber (2nd. edition, 1938).  (Convenient overview from the point of view of Christian symbolism; also, the earliest attestation of the exact phrase "Shield of the Trinity" that I can find)
 "Handbook of Christian Symbolism" by William James Audsley and George Ashdown Audsley (1865). (Probably the earliest significant source for the 19th-century revival of use)

Christian symbols
Trinitarianism
Heraldry
Christianity in the Middle Ages
Nature of Jesus Christ